Jezierski (feminine Jezierska) is a Polish surname. Notable people with the surname include:
 Adam Jezierski (born 1990), Spanish-Polish actor
 Andrzej Jezierski (born 1980), Polish canoer
 Franciszek Salezy Jezierski (1740–1791), Polish writer
 Ivona Jezierska (born 1958), Polish-American chess-player
 Jacek Jezierski (1722–1805), Polish writer
 Leszek Jezierski (1929–2008), Polish footballer
 Stefan de Leval Jezierski (born 1954), American hornist in the Berlin Philharmonic

Polish-language surnames